Rob Grootendorst (11 February 1944 in Schiedam – 23 February 2000 in Amsterdam) was a Dutch communication and argumentation theory scholar. He was professor for Dutch speech communication at the University of Amsterdam. His contributions to the argumentation field include the co-foundation of the pragma-dialectic school in argumentation theory.

He also wrote several books on the life and works of the Dutch writer and politician Theo Thijssen.

Biography 
Grootendorst was a teacher at an elementary school in the 1960s. He studied Dutch studies at the University of Amsterdam since 1980, and became a Ph.D. in 1982 in Speech Communication. The dissertation was jointly written with Frans H. van Eemeren. They jointly founded the International Society for the Study of Argumentation in 1986.

Selected works
Argumentation, Communication, and Fallacies: A Pragma-Dialectical Perspective (Hillsdale: Erlbaum, 1992), with van Eemeren
Fundamentals of Argumentation Theory: A Handbook of Historical Backgrounds and Contemporary Developments (Mahwah: Erlbaum, 1996), with van Eemeren

Notes

References 
 Hans V. Hansen (2000) Rob Grootendorst. In Memoriam. 1944-2000, ''Informal Logic, vol 20, No 2. pp. 203–204
 In memoriam Rob Grootendorst , Theo Thijssen museum

1944 births
2000 deaths
Linguists from the Netherlands
Communication theorists
People from Schiedam
University of Amsterdam alumni
Academic staff of the University of Amsterdam
Dutch logicians
20th-century linguists
20th-century Dutch philosophers